Haemophilus is a genus of Gram-negative, pleomorphic, coccobacilli bacteria belonging to the family Pasteurellaceae. While Haemophilus bacteria are typically small coccobacilli, they are categorized as pleomorphic bacteria because of the wide range of shapes they occasionally assume. These organisms inhabit the mucous membranes of the upper respiratory tract, mouth, vagina, and intestinal tract. The genus includes commensal organisms along with some significant pathogenic species such as H. influenzae—a cause of sepsis and bacterial meningitis in young children—and H. ducreyi, the causative agent of chancroid. All members are either aerobic or facultatively anaerobic. This genus has been found to be part of the salivary microbiome.

Metabolism
Members of the genus Haemophilus usually will not grow on blood agar plates, as most species require at least one of these blood factors for growth: hemin (X-factor) and/or nicotinamide adenine dinucleotide (V-factor). They are unable to synthesize important parts of the cytochrome system needed for respiration, and they obtain these substances from the heme fraction, known as the X factor, of blood hemoglobin. The culture medium must also supply the cofactor nicotinamide adenine dinucleotide (from either NAD+ or NADP+), which is known as the V factor. Clinical laboratories use tests for the requirement of the X and V factors to identify the isolates as Haemophilus species. The species Haemophilus haemoglobinophilus is an exception to this, and has been shown to grow well on both blood and chocolate agars.

Chocolate agar is an excellent Haemophilus growth medium, as it allows for increased accessibility to these factors. Alternatively, Haemophilus is sometimes cultured using the "Staph streak" technique: both Staphylococcus and Haemophilus organisms are cultured together on a single blood agar plate. In this case, Haemophilus colonies will frequently grow in small "satellite" colonies around the larger Staphylococcus colonies because the metabolism of Staphylococcus produces the necessary blood factor byproducts required for Haemophilus growth.

References

External links
 Haemophilus chapter in Baron's Medical Microbiology (online at the NCBI bookshelf).

 
Bacteria genera